Rosalie Louise Carey  ( Seddon; 18 May 1921 – 29 June 2011) was a New Zealand actor, playwright, director and author who founded the Globe Theatre in Dunedin, the first purpose-built theatre for professional repertory in New Zealand, with then-husband Patric Carey. In 2010 Carey was appointed a Member of the New Zealand Order of Merit for services to the theatre. The New Zealand Society of Authors made Carey an honorary life member.

Early life 
Carey was born on 18 May 1921 to parents Ada Yvonne Rica Seddon and Richard Stephen Rowley Seddon.

Carey was brought up in Lumsden and Hamilton, and planned to study theatre and acting in England but had to change her plans after the outbreak of World War II. She was an elocution and voice production teacher in Waikato, before joining the New Zealand Women's Auxiliary Air Force.  She adapted two novels which were performed in Hamilton, and wrote and played the lead part in Amy Robsart, performed in 1940, receiving particular attention for her costuming and for using a suit worn by Sir Henry Irving for the leading man. Carey's older sister Audrey Seddon studied commercial art in London, and provided two posters for advertising the play.

England 
After the war, Carey travelled to England, where she studied at the Guildhall School of Music and Drama in London, and worked in repertory and provincial theatre, including with the Adelphi Guild Theatre. Carey met Patric Carey, an Irish theatre designer, in Cornwall and they were married at the church in Gulval before traveling to New Zealand in 1953.

Return to New Zealand 
On their return, the Careys initially settled in Wellington, and Carey joined the New Zealand Players, a touring professional theatre company. At that time in New Zealand there was no other professional theatre. When the Dunedin Repertory Society offered Patric Carey the position of director, the couple moved south, and purchased a large wooden house at 104 London Street in Dunedin. The house had been built by architect William Mason as his personal residence, however prior to their purchase it had changed hands several times, most recently having been rented out, and was in a deteriorated condition. The Careys staged plays in the garden and drawing room.

The Globe 
The Careys decided to extend the house into a theatre, digging the foundations in 1957. The extension, designed by Niel Mason, included a domed ceiling, and a stage with no proscenium arch. It was built by volunteers and Patric Carey, with the oversight of engineer Ben Elson. The Globe was the first purpose-built theatre for professional repertory in New Zealand.

Later life 
Patric Carey retired to Mahinerangi some years after the theatre was sold to the Friends in 1971, and the Careys dissolved their marriage in 1982. Patric Carey died in 2006.

Carey was a member of the Whangarei Writers Workshop, the Playwrights Association of New Zealand, and wrote several books, including A Theatre in the House: The Careys' Globe, poetry, a children's book, and a memoir It's Not What You Know. She was an honorary life member of the New Zealand Society of Authors.

Carey was appointed a Member of the New Zealand Order of Merit, for services to the theatre, in the 2010 New Year Honours. She died in Whangārei on 29 June 2011.

Selected publications

References 

New Zealand dramatists and playwrights
New Zealand women writers
1921 births
2011 deaths
New Zealand theatre directors